Monipur High School & College (MHSC)  is a secondary school and college founded in 1969, located in Mirpur, Dhaka, Bangladesh. The school is also known as Monipur Uccha Biddalaya Ebong College (MUBC).

Academic results 
In 2007, 2008, and 2009, the school was ranked third, and in 2010 and 2011 the school ranked sixth and seventh respectively and was ranked eighth in the 2012 SSC examination under the Dhaka Education Board. From 2011 to 2019 this school was ranked first in the PEC Examination.

The school secured the second position in terms of securing the highest number of first divisions in the primary terminal examinations across the country in 2010. A total of 1,516 students achieved first division from Viqarunnisa Noon School and College while 1,126 from Monipur High School & College and 962 from Ideal School and College.

652 students scored 80% mark called A+ (or GPA 5.0) in 2008 and 556 students achieved the same in 2009, placing the school in the top three in Bangladesh's GPA 5 based schools ranking.

The school has achieved second place in the evaluation examination of class Eight held under the Department of Secondary and Higher Education.

Campuses 
Following demands to enroll more students, the school authorities opened three more branches in Dhaka city, while the main campus at Monipur continues to operate. Monipur High School opened its college section in 2012 with about 52 students. The college section is situated at the Rupnagar branch (Branch-1) with its own dedicated campus. Which means there are now five school campuses and one college branch.

1. Main Branch (60 Feet)

2. Main Branch (Monipur)

3. Branch - 01

4. Branch - 02

5. Branch - 03

6. College Branch

Administration

Grading System

Result

In 2007, 2008, and 2009, the school secured 3rd position in the Secondary School Certificate Examination held under the Dhaka Board of Education. Achieving A + (GPA 5) of 652 and 558 students in this examination in 2008 and 2009 respectively naturally ranks the school among the best 3rd schools in Bangladesh in terms of GPA 5. In 2009, it secured 2nd place in the 8th class assessment examination held under the Department of Secondary and Higher Secondary Education. Established in 1989, the school has twice been recognized as the best educational institution in Bangladesh.

See also
 Directorate of Secondary and Higher Education (DSHE)
 Board of Intermediate and Secondary Education, Dhaka
 Education in Bangladesh

References

External links
 Official website Of MHSC
 Official Facebook Page of MHSC
 Official LinkedIn Page of MHSC

Schools in Dhaka District
High schools in Bangladesh
1969 establishments in East Pakistan
Educational institutions established in 1969